Cauquenia is a genus of spiders in the family Zoropsidae. It was first described in 2013 by Piacentini, Ramírez & Silva. , it contains only one species, Cauquenia maule, found in Chile.

References

Zoropsidae
Monotypic Araneomorphae genera
Spiders of South America
Endemic fauna of Chile